Nine Elms is a London Underground station in Nine Elms, London. The station opened on 20 September 2021, as part of the Northern line extension to Battersea. It serves the rapidly growing area, New Covent Garden Market and the Embassy of the United States.

It is close to the site of the former Nine Elms railway station, once the terminus of the London and South Western Railway.

Services

The station is in Zone 1, served by the Northern line as part of the two-station extension from Kennington. The extension runs on to the redevelopment of Battersea Power Station.

Service pattern

10tph to Battersea Power Station (12tph at peak times)
8tph to High Barnet via Charing Cross (10tph at peak times)
2tph to Mill Hill East via Charing Cross

Connections
London Buses routes 77, 87, 196, 452 and night route N87 serve the station.

Design
The station entrance was designed by Grimshaw, and the future over-station development will be designed by Assael Architecture.  Design provisions for potential future installation of platform screen doors have been added to the station.

In September 2019, Art on the Underground announced that the artist Samara Scott had been commissioned to install a permanent artwork in the station's ticket hall. Before the opening of the extension in September 2021, it was confirmed that this artwork was not installed due to technical reasons. Another commission will take place for artwork at the station in future.

Space around the station

The future over-station development will provide over 400 new homes (with 40 percent being affordable), office space, retail and a new public square serving the station. This will allow Transport for London to recoup some of the costs of building the station, as well as providing long-term revenue for TfL.

An archway under the Nine Elms to Waterloo Viaduct has been opened up as a pedestrian route, allowing easier north–south access through the area, as well as improving access to the Embassy Gardens and US Embassy developments.

A large Sainsbury’s superstore was demolished to make way for the station and was rebuilt and reopened in 2016. The new store is directly adjacent to the station.

History

Construction 
The station was given the final approval by the Secretary of State for Transport in November 2014, and construction began in 2015. The station was built using the cut-and-cover station box method, ensuring easy access during construction, as well as allowing future construction of a mixed-use development on top of the station.

The station was projected to open along with the rest of the extension in 2020, but in December 2018, the Mayor of London, Sadiq Khan, announced that the project's opening would be delayed for a year.

By June 2019, major tunnelling and track works had been completed, with an engineering train running on the extension for the first time. By February 2020, construction of the station was nearly complete, with platforms, escalators and the London Underground roundel installed on the station.

Opening 
The station opened on 20 September 2021. 

In September 2022, TfL announced that over 5 million trips had been made on the extension since opening, with an average of 40,000 trips a week at Nine Elms, around half that of Battersea Power Station.

References

External links

 Northern Line Extension from TfL

Buildings and structures in the London Borough of Lambeth
Nine Elms
Northern line stations
Railway stations in Great Britain opened in 2021
Tube stations in the London Borough of Lambeth